Wilglory Tanjong is an American entrepreneur of Cameroonian descent. She is the founder of Anima Iris, a fashion handbag brand.

Biography

Tanjong is from Cameroon and moved to Maryland at the age of two. She graduated from Princeton University and moved to Atlanta, Georgia where she took a position at a manufacturing and supply company. She left the company to travel around Africa for six months. During that time, she started a community of artisans who made handbags, jewelry and shoes. In February 2020, she launched Anima Iris, a fashion handbag brand.

Tanjong attends Wharton School of the University of Pennsylvania where she is a full-time student pursuing a MBA.

References

External links 
 LinkedIn profile

Living people
American businesspeople
Businesspeople
Princeton University alumni
Year of birth missing (living people)